Hubert Wu is a Cantopop Hong Kong singer-songwriter and actor. He debuted in 2010 after getting becoming the runner up of season 2 of The Voice (Hong Kong).

Music awards

IFPI Hong Kong Sales Awards

RTHK Top 10 Gold Songs Awards
The RTHK Top 10 Gold Songs Awards Ceremony(:zh:十大中文金曲頒獎音樂會) is held annually in Hong Kong since 1978.  The awards are determined by Radio and Television Hong Kong based on the work of all Asian artistes (mostly cantopop) for the previous year.

Metro Showbiz Hit Awards

The Metro Showbiz Hit Awards (新城勁爆頒獎禮) is held in Hong Kong annually by Metro Showbiz radio station.  It focus mostly in cantopop music.

Metro Radio Mandarin Music Awards
Metro Radio Mandarin Music Awards (新城國語力頒獎禮) is held in Hong Kong annually by Metro Showbiz radio station.  It focus mostly in Mandopop music, it was first awarded in 2002 and ended in 2015.

Music Videos Awards Hong Kong
It is organized by IFPI (Hong Kong) in 2015.

Jade Solid Gold Best 10 Awards Presentation

Jade Solid Gold Songs Selections

TVB Anniversary Awards

TVB Star Awards Malaysia

StarHub TVB Awards

RoadShow Cantonese Songs Chart Awards

Canadian Chinese Pop Chart Awards

Yahoo Asia Buzz Awards

TVB8 Mandarin Music On Demand Awards Presentation

"King of Music" Global Chinese Music Awards

Music Pioneer Chart

Yes! Idol Selection

People's Choice Television Awards

Hong Kong Television Awards

Other awards

TVB Anniversary Awards

TVB Star Awards Malaysia

Asian Television Awards

People's Choice Television Awards

Hong Kong Television Awards

References

Wu, Hubert